The London and North Western Railway (LNWR) Class C1 was a class of 0-8-0 steam locomotives.  34 were rebuilt by Charles Bowen Cooke from Class A 3-cylinder compounds between 1909 and 1912.

History
Rebuilds of the troublesome Webb Class A compounds to Class D simple expansion engines used larger (5'2" diameter) boilers, with the result that there were many spare smaller (4'3" diameter) boilers available.  As a result, rebuilds of the Class As from 1906 retained their smaller boilers.  As a consequence, the cylinders had to be reduced to 18.5" diameter, compared with 19.5" with the Class C, and this took them into a new class (or subclass) - C1.

Numbering
When rebuilt from Class A, all the C1s retained their existing LNWR numbers, which were in the 18xx or 25xx series. All passed into LMS ownership on the grouping of 1923. The LMS assigned them the numbers 8968-9001, sequentially in order of rebuild date, though not all were applied before withdrawal.

LMS numbers in parentheses were not carried prior to withdrawal.

Withdrawal
Withdrawal occurred between 1927 and 1932.  None was preserved.

References

Further reading
 
 
 

C1
0-8-0 locomotives
Railway locomotives introduced in 1906
Standard gauge steam locomotives of Great Britain
Scrapped locomotives